Inuit Arctic Business Alliance is a partnership between three Alaska native corporations, the Arctic Slope Regional Corporation, NANA Regional Corporation and Bering Straits Native Corporation. The alliance board is headed by Rex Rock.

References 

Alaska Native regional corporations